Fort Saskatchewan Senior High School (a.k.a. Fort High) is a public high school located in Fort Saskatchewan, Alberta, Canada. It serves approximately 450 students in Grades 10 through 12.

History
In the early morning hours of Wednesday, March 5, 1986, firemen began fighting the raging fire that took half of the school. The firemen were called back several times during the day to put out smaller fires. A straw-insulated roof fed the fire in the nearly thirty-year-old building. Rumors were that the fire had been started by an overhead projector on the 2nd floor.  Distraught students and teachers arrived at 7:00 AM to witness the disaster. Many emotions were stirred within the teachers and students as they realized the outcome.

Luckily, the fire did not spread to the other half of the school which housed the gym, several classrooms and two computer rooms.  Some damage was done to the general office and library and they were not usable. Historical documents, like the graduation pictures that lined both sides of the main hallway were damaged beyond repair.  In time, this collection of photographs was restored with the 1986 class being the first.

The school became known as Fort Half High.  Within close quarters many activities continued successfully after the fire. The lunch room and gym became class rooms. Educational gym classes were moved to the Fort Saskatchewan Correction Facility's gym that was shared with the inmates.

In late 1987, new wings were completed and students attended a completed school thus ending Fort Half High.

In 1990, the Fort Saskatchewan High School's football team, known formerly as the Rams since opening, joined the other school teams and became known as the Sting.

Services
 Food Services
 Library Services
 Counseling and Guidance
 Advanced Placement Program
 Knowledge and Employability Skills program
 French as a second language
 German as a second language

Notable alumni
 Mike Commodore, NHL player
 Joffrey Lupul, NHL player
 Ray Whitney, NHL player

External links
Official site

High schools in Alberta
Fort Saskatchewan
Educational institutions in Canada with year of establishment missing